Solo is a 2018 Spanish drama film directed by Hugo Stuven and written by Santiago Lallana and Hugo Stuven about a young surfer who falls off a cliff, injures himself and finds himself in a situation where he needs to fight for his survival.

Plot 
The plot dramatises the plight of Álvaro Vizcaíno, a surfer temporarily disappeared after falling from a cliff in Fuerteventura in 2014.

Cast

Release 
The film was presented at the Málaga Film Festival in April 2018. Distributed by Filmax, it was theatrically released in Spain on 3 August 2018.

Reception 
Andrea G. Bermejo of Cinemanía rated the film 3 out of 5 stars, writing that Alain Hernández "perfectly masters the screaming scale [of desperation] playing [surfer] Álvaro Vizcaíno".

Beatriz Martínez of Fotogramas rated the film 3 out of 5 stars highlighting a very committed Hernández as the film's standout whilst citing the "dated" attempts of "visual poetry" as a drawback.

See also 
 List of Spanish films of 2018

References

External links 
 
 

2018 films
2018 drama films
Spanish drama films
2010s Spanish-language films
2010s survival films
2010s Spanish films
Films set in the Canary Islands
Surfing films